Turvey may refer to:

As a surname

Sport
 Anna Turvey (born 1980), Irish cyclist
 Joanne Turvey (born 1969), British rower
 Cedric Turvey (1917–1991), Australian rugby league footballer
 Nathan Turvey (born 1977), Australian rules footballer 
 Oliver Turvey (born 1987), British racing driver

Other
 Brad Turvey (born 1978), Filipino actor
 Cassius Turvey (2007–2022), Aboriginal Australian boy killed in Perth
 Hugh Turvey (born 1971), British artist and photographer
 John Turvey (1944–2006), Canadian social worker
 Malcolm Turvey, British film studies professor
 Michael Turvey, American psychology professor
 Nick Turvey (1931–2006), South African pilot
 Philip Turvey (1875–1955), Australian politician
 Vincent Turvey (1873–1912), clairvoyant and parapsychologist

Fictional characters 
 Kevin Turvey, 1980s British TV comedy character played by Rik Mayall

Places 
 Turvey, Bedfordshire, England, a village
 Turvey House, County Dublin, Ireland, manor house demolished in 1987
 Turvey House and Gardens, a country house in Bedfordshire
 Turvey Park, New South Wales, a suburb of Wagga Wagga

See also
 Alan Turvey Trophy, a football tournament in England 
 Turvey railway station, former station in England